Pterostylis stenosepala, commonly known as the narrow-sepalled leafy greenhood, is a plant in the orchid family Orchidaceae and is endemic to New South Wales. Flowering plants have up to six shiny, translucent green flowers with darker green stripes. The flowers have an insect-like labellum which is green with a dark green mound on its upper end. Non-flowering plants have a rosette of leaves on a stalk, but flowering plants lack the rosette, instead having between four and eight stem leaves.

Description
Pterostylis stenosepala, is a terrestrial,  perennial, deciduous, herb with an underground tuber. The dorsal sepal and petals are fused, forming a hood or "galea" over the column. The petals have a wide, transparent flange on their outer edges. Flowering occurs from August to October.

Taxonomy and naming
This greenhood was first formally described in 2006 by David Jones and given the name Bunochilus stenosapalus. The description was published in Australian Orchid Research from a specimen collected in Conimbla National Park. In 2010, Gary Backhouse changed the name to Pterostylis stenosepala. The specific epithet (stenosepala) is derived from the Ancient Greek word stenos meaning "narrow" and the New Latin word sepalum meaning "sepal", referring to the narrow lateral sepals.

Distribution and habitat
The narrow-sepalled leafy greenhood grows in forest with grasses or shrubs near Orange and Cowra in the Central Tablelands and Central West Slopes.

References

stenosepala
Endemic orchids of Australia
Orchids of New South Wales
Plants described in 2006